Simon Schempp (born 14 November 1988) is a German former biathlete.

Career
In 2009, he made his World Cup debut. He became world champion by winning gold in the 15 km mass start race at the Biathlon World Championships 2017 in Hochfilzen. He also won three more gold medals, two for being part of the German Biathlon World Championships 2010 mixed relay team in Khanty-Mansiysk and the German Biathlon World Championships 2017 mixed relay team in Hochfilzen, and one gold medal as part of the German Biathlon World Championships 2015 men's relay team in Kontiolahti.

He also competed for Germany at the 2010 Winter Olympics, finishing fifth as part of the German team in the men's relay.

On 28 January 2021, he announced his retirement.

Biathlon results
All results are sourced from the International Biathlon Union.

Olympic Games
2 medals (2 silver)

*The mixed relay was added as an event in 2014.

World Championships
8 medals (4 gold, 2 silver, 2 bronze)

*During Olympic seasons competitions are only held for those events not included in the Olympic program.

Junior/Youth World Championships
5 medals (2 gold, 1 silver, 2 bronze)

World Cup

Individual victories
12 victories (5 Sp, 4 Pu, 3 MS)

*Results are from UIPMB and IBU races which include the Biathlon World Cup, Biathlon World Championships and the Winter Olympic Games.

References

External links

1988 births
Living people
People from Mutlangen
Sportspeople from Stuttgart (region)
German male biathletes
Biathletes at the 2010 Winter Olympics
Biathletes at the 2014 Winter Olympics
Biathletes at the 2018 Winter Olympics
Olympic biathletes of Germany
Medalists at the 2014 Winter Olympics
Medalists at the 2018 Winter Olympics
Olympic medalists in biathlon
Olympic silver medalists for Germany
Olympic bronze medalists for Germany
Biathlon World Championships medalists